Kharela is a town and a nagar panchayat in Mahoba district in the Indian state of Uttar Pradesh.

Demographics
 India census, Kharela had a population of 13,471. Males constitute 55% of the population and females 45%. Kharela has an average literacy rate of 55%, lower than the national average of 74%: male literacy is 65%, and female literacy is 48%. 17% of the population is under 6 years of age.

References

Bundelkhand
Cities and towns in Mahoba district